Jan.E.Man is a 2021 Indian Malayalam-language comedy drama film written and directed by the debutant Chidambaram. It was co-written by Ganapathi (Chidambaram's younger brother) and Sapnesh Varachal. The film stars Basil Joseph, Balu Varghese, Lal, Arjun Ashokan and Ganapathi in important roles. The film was produced by Lakshmi Warrier, Ganesh Menon, Sajith Kookal and Shawn Antony under the banner of Cheers Entertainment. The film was released on 19 November 2021, and was unanimously met with critical acclaim with praise towards the performances (particularly Basil Joseph's and Balu Varghese's), clean humour, emotional depth, story and Chidambaran's direction.

Plot 

Joymon is a nurse in the desolate part of Canada. He decides to come home to Kerala to celebrate his 30th birthday with his old school friends. He decides to celebrate his birthday from his friend Sampath's house(Arjun Ashokan).Sampath and Faizal (Ganapathi S Poduval) initially do not like the idea of Joymon celebrating his birthday but he reluctantly agrees when he was offered free drinks on the event. At the same time a house opposite Sampath's house was undergoing a funeral due to the death of the old man in the house. Joymon and his friends are left in a tight spot. Misunderstanding, selfishness, and clash of personalities becomes the premise of the movie.

Cast 
 Basil Joseph as Joymon
 Arjun Ashokan as Sambath
 Ganapathi S Poduval as Dr. Faizal Khan
 Balu Varghese as Monichan
 Lal as Plathottathil Kochukunju
 Siddharth Menon as Ratheesh aka (TV Serial artist Nandan Varma)
 Riya Saira as Jesnamol
 Ganga Meera as Sambath's mother
 Abhiram Radhakrishnan as Akshay Kumar
 Sajin Gopu as Saji Vypin
 Prashant Murali as Chacko
 Sarath Sabha as Kannan
 Sruthy Sathyan as Aiswarya
 Prapti Elizabeth as Ammu
 Chembil Ashokan
 Gilu Joseph as Saramma
 Remya Suresh
 Maneesha K.S. as Police constable Neighbour
Kunjukutty as Havildar. Palathottathil Ittiyavara
Asif Ali (actor) as young Havildar. Plathottathil Ittiyavara (voice only)

Production 
The movie marks the directional debut of Chidambaram. The movie was made during the COVID-19 pandemic and its shooting started on 9 September 2020, and it was wrapped up in 35 days. It was shot in Kochi and Kashmir. Arjun Ashokan and Balu Varghese were part of the project from the get-go.

Vishnu Thandassery, who had worked in many films as a still photographer has debuted as a cinematographer through this film. Bijibal composed the background score for this movie. Kiran Das is the editor and Vinesh Bangalan is the art director of the film. R. G. Vayandan did the makeup and Mahser Hamsa arranged the costumes for the movie. The film was co-written by Ganapathi S Poduval who is the brother of the director.

Marketing 
The teaser of the movie was released by Dulquer Salmaan on 9 July 2021. Mohanlal, Tovino Thomas and Asif Ali released the first look poster of the film on 30 August 2021. The song Mizhiyoram from the 1980 Malayalam movie Manjil Virinja Pookkal was remastered in this film. The song was released by Manju Warrier on 3 November 2021. The official trailer of the film was released on 11 November 2021, by Mammootty through his official Facebook Page. The satellite right of the movie was grabbed by Surya Tv.

Release 
The movie was released in theatres of Kerala on 19 November 2021. Initially the movie had previews in 90 release centers, the movie was welcomed by a low initial response but after increased demand from the audience, the movie was previewed in 150 release centers across Kerala after a week. The movie was released outside Kerala on 10 December 2021.

Reception 
The movie received critical acclaim from the critics as well as from the audience. The Times of India gave a rating of 3.5 on 5 and wrote that, "This is a film that will make you both laugh and cry at the same time, offering insights into the meaning of happiness, togetherness, friendship and more. This movie is suited for those who like situational comedy, real-life people and quirky connections." Sajin Srijith of The New Indian Express commented that, "Jan.E.Man is a welcome bundle of laughs, emotions, and other surprises. The film finds a neat balance between its laughs and intense emotions." Firstpost rated the movie with 3.5 on 5 and exclaimed, "The outcome of Chidambaram's confident direction and a sharp script is an intelligent and entertaining film." Appreciating the script and the performances of the movie S. R. Praveen of The Hindu wrote that, "Jan-E-man, with its inventive script and earnest performances, hits all the right notes."

Vishal Menon of Film Companion said that, "Jan.E.Man is a movie that you would have got when Lijo Jose Pellissery had co-directed Ee.Ma.Yau. with Rafi Mecartin. The movie is an original, if uneven, dark comedy with an excellent ensemble." Sify gave a rating of 3.5 on 5 and wrote that, "Jan-E-Man is A feel good entertainer. Lal and Balu Varghese shines as Kochu Kunju and Monichan respectively. Arjun Ashokan, Ganapathi, Basil Joseph, Riya Saira and Siddharth Menon are impressive." Malayala Manorama appreciated the movie by writing that, "Janeman is a procession of laughter." OTT Play gives a rating of 3.5 on 5 and writes that, "Jan.E.Man movie review: Basil Joseph, Arjun Ashokan -starrer takes you on a rollercoaster ride of emotions."

References

External links 

2021 films
2020s Malayalam-language films
2021 comedy-drama films
Indian comedy-drama films
Films shot in Kerala
Films shot in Kochi
Films shot in Canada
Films shot in Toronto
2021 directorial debut films